Vilnius Boys' Gymnasiums  were two secondary education institutions that existed in Vilnius while it was part of the Russian Empire. The 1st Gymnasium was opened in 1803 and closed in 1918. The 1st and 2nd gymnasiums were located in the premises of Vilnius University, abolished after the failed November Uprising of 1830. Vilnius Girls' Gymnasium was established in 1860.

History

1st Gymnasium

On 4 April 1803, Tsar Alexander I of Russia signed a decree which transformed the preparatory school attached to the Chief School of the Duchy of Lithuania (i.e. Vilnius University) into a gymnasium. It remained attached to and run by the university. Initially, the education lasted six years.

The gymnasium had deep historical traditions and was closely associated with the university. It shared not only the premises and library, but also some faculty. Of nine teachers in 1803, five were Vilnius University alumni, two had studied abroad, and two were priests. Therefore, it acted as a feeder school for the university. Out of 115 professors who taught at the university in 1803–1832, 15 were graduates of the gymnasium.

The secret student societies Philomaths and Filaret Association were discovered when a student of the gymnasium wrote on the blackboard "Long live the Constitution of 3 May 1791!" in May 1823. Tsarist police launched an investigation that spread to schools in Kaunas, Kėdainiai, Panevėžys, Svislach as well as Kražiai College. Many students were expelled or sentenced to katorga.

After the closure of Vilnius University in 1832, the gymnasium inherited some remnants of its collection, including books, numismatic samples, scientific implements. In 1843, after the closure of the university and Catholic monasteries, several old bequests by nobles were consolidated to establish a dormitory that would provide free housing for 65 students. Inspired by the Revolutions of 1848, several students started organizing an uprising against the Tsarist regime. However, the plot was discovered and 191 people were arrested; of them, 74 were current or former students of the gymnasium. In 1849, the school was prohibited to admit children of tax-paying classes (i.e. non-nobles) without special individual exemptions. At the time, the school had 73 such students, all of them sons of craftsmen. In 1871, to prevent modern and revolutionary ideas, Minister of Education Dmitry Tolstoy reorganized gymnasiums (including the one in Vilnius) to eight-year schools based on "classical" curriculum which spent as much as 40% of time on Latin and Greek languages.

In 1803, the 1st Gymnasium had nine teachers and 280 students. The number of students increased to 420 in 1805 and 753 in 1828. In 1826–1827, more than 90% of students were Roman Catholics. The number of students decreased to 375 in 1835–1836, but jumped to 880 in 1845. During the Uprising of 1863, the number of students decreased by 271 or 28% as students were expelled or voluntarily left in support of the uprising. About 10% of the children were Jews, while the rest were almost evenly split between Roman Catholics and Eastern Orthodoxs.

The 1st Gymnasium was officially closed on 23 February 1918.

2nd Gymnasium
After the failed November Uprising, the university and many other schools were closed. Bucking the trend, the 2nd Boys' Gymnasium was opened in 1834. In October 1838, it was transformed into Vilnius Institute for Nobles meant for 100 sons of nobles. The institute was meant as a tool of Russification; its students were encouraged to join the Russian Imperial Army. As such, it did not become popular among the Lithuanian nobles and was closed in 1863.

The concept of "real schools" was borrowed from Germany. They provided more practical education (i.e. math and science) than the "classical" gymnasiums, but its graduates could not apply to universities. The , including the one in Vilnius, were reorganized into  in 1872.

The 2nd Gymnasium was reestablished in 1884 after a reorganization of a six-year progymnasium. In the early 20th century, tuition cost 75 Russian rubles at the 2nd Gymnasium.

Both gymnasiums lived side by side, separated by a fence, and had a common house of prayer – Saints Cyril and Methodius Church with icons painted by local academic Ivan Trutnev.

People of the 1st Gymnasium

Directors 
 Pyotr Bessonov, director from 1865, Russian folklorist

Notable faculty 
 , physicist, professor
 , karaim hachan, professor
 Nestor Kukolnik, playwright

Notable students 
 Vladimir Beneshevich, graduated in 1893, historian
 César Cui, composer and Engineer-General
 Emeryk Hutten-Czapski, 1846, Count, numismatist
 Jan Czerski, geographer
 Simonas Daukantas, historian
 Felix Dzerzhinsky, Bolshevik revolutionary
 Vasily Kachalov, 1894, theatre actor
 Adam Kirkor, 1838, ethnographer, publisher
 Ignaty Krachkovsky, 1901, academic, arabist
 , historian, archaeologist
 Józef Piłsudski, 1885, Chief of State and then First Marshal of Poland
 Pyotr Stolypin, Prime Minister of the Russian Empire
 Eustachy Tyszkiewicz, archaeologist
 Walery Antoni Wróblewski, 1853, revolutionary
 , 1826, Belarusian ethnographer

People of the 2nd Gymnasium

Notable faculty 
 Yefim Karsky, from 1885, linguist and ethnographer

Notable students 
 Mikhail Bakhtin, philosopher
 Mstislav Dobuzhinsky, 1895, painter
 Nikolay Krestinsky, 1901, Bolshevik revolutionary and Soviet politician
 Ivan Solonevich, philosopher, historian, writer
 Branislaw Tarashkyevich, 1911, Belarusian linguist
 Antanas Tumėnas, 1900, Prime Minister of Lithuania

Citations and references

Cited sources

Further reading

External links 
 Alphabet list of more than 3000 surnames of graduates of the 1st Vilnius Gymnasium in 1837–1903, 2nd Vilnius Gymnasium in 1876–1902, Vilnius Teachers' Institute in 1878–1900 and the Shklov Cadet Corps in 1785–1824 (in Russian)

Defunct schools in Vilnius
1803 establishments in the Russian Empire
Educational institutions established in 1803
Educational institutions disestablished in 1918
History of education in Lithuania